The 2024 ACC Emerging Teams Asia Cup will be the sixth edition of the ACC Emerging Teams Asia Cup is scheduled to played in November to December 2024 in Dambulla, Sri Lanka. Eight teams in the tournament are A teams from India, Pakistan, Sri Lanka, Afghanistan, Bangladesh and 3 qualifiers from the 2024 ACC Men's Premier Cup. The tournament was organized by the Asian Cricket Council (ACC).

Teams
The teams were placed in the following groups.

References

Cricket in Asia
Asian Cricket Council competitions